Vaynor (Welsh: Y Faenor, meaning "The Manor") is a village and community (formerly a parish) in Merthyr Tydfil County Borough in Wales, United Kingdom. The population of the community at the 2011 census was 3,551.

Location 

It is about four miles north of the town of Merthyr Tydfil and is within the borders of the Brecon Beacons National Park.

The community includes the three villages of Cefn-coed-y-cymmer, Trefechan and Pontsticill as well as Pontsarn and Vaynor. To the west are Nant Glais Caves.
It also includes the southern section of Pontsticill Reservoir and the eastern end of Llwyn-On Reservoir.

History 

Until 1974, the village was a civil parish in the Vaynor and Penderyn Rural District of Brecknockshire.  From 1974 to 1996, it was part of Merthyr Tydfil district in Mid Glamorgan. It is notable for its connections with the Ironmaster Robert Crawshay, owner of the world's first ironworks at Cyfarthfa, who is buried in Vaynor churchyard.

Governance
Between 1973 and 1996 Vaynor was an electoral ward to Merthyr Tydfil District Council, initially electing three district councillors. Subsequently, Vaynor became a ward to Merthyr Tydfil County Borough Council, electing two (generally Independent) county councillors.

See also
Quarries of Vaynor

References

External links 
 Old Merthyr Tydfil: Vaynor - Historical Photographs of Vaynor.
 GENUKI page
 www.geograph.co.uk : photos of Vaynor and surrounding area
 

Villages in Merthyr Tydfil County Borough
Communities in Merthyr Tydfil County Borough
Wards of Merthyr Tydfil County Borough